Rotana Jet ( Rūtānā Jat) is an airline with its main base at Al Bateen Executive Airport, Abu Dhabi. Its corporate head office is located in the NOVOTEL Gate Hotel, Khor Al Maqta Gate City, Abu Dhabi, United Arab Emirates. While it initially operated only executive charter flights; Rotana started scheduled flights to Sir Bani Yas island in June 2012 but suspended scheduled operations in 2017. Its flights to Fujairah made it the first domestic airline to connect two emirates. On 6 April 2014, the airline announced Colombo and Mattala as its first international destinations outside the Gulf Cooperation Council.

Destinations

Fleet

The Rotana Jet fleet comprises the following aircraft (as of July 2019):

The airline fleet previously included the following aircraft (as of July 2017):
 1 Gulfstream G450
 2 Embraer ERJ 145 (out of service)
 1 Airbus A319-100

References

External links

 Official website

Airlines of the United Arab Emirates
Airlines established in 2010
Companies based in Abu Dhabi
Emirati companies established in 2010